Definite form may refer to:

Definite quadratic form in mathematics
Definiteness in linguistics